Androsace brevis is an alpine plant in the family Primulaceae, a narrow endemic cushion plant that grows above 2000 m asl on rocky ridges and peaks in a restricted area in the Alps of Northern Italy (Lombardy) and adjacent Switzerland. Following IUCN criteria, its conservation status is Vulnerable (VU). The flowering period is very short, typically lasting about 2 weeks between the end of May and the beginning of June, immediately after snowmelt, when snow still occurs in the vicinity.

References 

brevis
Alpine flora
Flora of the Alps
Flora of Italy
Flora of Switzerland